Bhadravati, Bhadrawati or Bhadravathi may refer to:

 Bhadravati, Karnataka, an industrial city and taluk in India
 Bhadravati, Maharashtra (formerly Bhandak), a city and municipal council in India